Harry Cornelius Englund (August 13, 1900 – March 16, 1989) was an American football end who played two seasons with the Chicago Staleys/Bears and  of the National Football League. He attended Rockford Central High School in Rockford, Illinois.

References

External links
Just Sports Stats

1900 births
1989 deaths
Players of American football from Illinois
American football ends
American football halfbacks
Chicago Staleys players
Chicago Bears players
Sportspeople from Rockford, Illinois